Remy Le Boeuf (born August 3, 1986) is a jazz saxophonist, composer and multi-instrumentalist born in Santa Cruz, California. He co-leads the jazz group Le Boeuf Brothers, and has a successful solo career as a composer and sideman integrating jazz, classical, and indie-rock genres. The New York Times describes his music as “evocative”.

Biography
Born and raised in Santa Cruz, California, Le Boeuf started playing oboe at age 10 and picked up the saxophone a year later. In high school, he began performing regularly with his twin brother, Pascal Le Boeuf, and the brothers started their modern jazz group, Le Boeuf Brothers.  In 2004, Remy moved to New York City to attend the Manhattan School of Music where he received his bachelor's and master's degrees and began working professionally.

As a composer, Le Boeuf has received commissions from SFJAZZ, The Jerome Foundation, New York Youth Symphony, and Keio University. As a performer, Le Boeuf has worked as a sideman with various artists including Grammy Award-winning Bob Mintzer’s Big Band, Haim, Dayna Stephens, Alan Ferber, Dave Leibman, Linda Oh, indie-pop band Wildcat! Wildcat! and Donny McCaslin.

Le Boeuf has performed throughout the world including North America, Europe and Asia. He has received many honors and awards for compositions and performances including recognition from ASCAP and Downbeat magazine, both individually and as part of Le Boeuf Brothers. Additional awards include the 2015 Commission Award from SFJAZZ and the 2016 ASCAP Young Jazz Composer Award.

As of 2022, Le Boeuf is Director of Jazz and Commercial Music Studies at the University of Denver’s Lamont School of Music.

Awards
Remy Le Boeuf was nominated in 2021 for a Grammy Award for Best Instrumental Composition and a Grammy Award for Best Arrangement, Instrumental or A Cappella for composing and arranging work on his album Assembly of Shadows.

Discography

As Leader

As Sideman

Composer/Arranger

Filmography

References

American jazz composers
American male jazz composers
American jazz saxophonists
American male saxophonists
American male video game actors
American male voice actors
Living people
1986 births
Manhattan School of Music alumni
Musicians from Santa Cruz, California
21st-century American composers
21st-century American male actors
21st-century American saxophonists
21st-century American male musicians
21st-century jazz composers
Jazz musicians from California